Countdown: The Savoy Sessions  is a compilation album by jazz musicians John Coltrane and Wilbur Harden. It was issued on Savoy Records in 1978 as SJL 2203 and comprises all the pieces recorded on the March 13, 1958 session. Actually, the only unissued original track is "Count Down", the remainder being mere alternate takes of the pieces featured on Mainstream 1958: The East Coast Jazz Scene. All the tracks can also be found on two compilations which feature the complete Savoy recordings made by Harden and Coltrane together, The Complete Mainstream 1958 Sessions (2009) and The Complete Savoy Sessions (1999).

Track listing
 "Wells Fargo I" – 7:26
 "Wells Fargo II" [master] – 7:16
 "E.F.F.P.H" – 5:26
 "Count Down I" [master] – 7:26
 "Count Down II" – 7:56
 "Rhodomagnetics I" [master] – 7:11
 "Rhodomagnetics II " – 7:59
 "Snuffy" – 9:37
 "West 42nd Street" – 7:51

Personnel
 John Coltrane – tenor saxophone
 Wilbur Harden – trumpet, flugelhorn
 Tommy Flanagan – piano
 Doug Watkins – bass
 Louis Hayes – drums

References

1978 compilation albums
John Coltrane compilation albums
Savoy Records compilation albums
Wilbur Harden albums
Compilation albums published posthumously
Albums recorded at Van Gelder Studio